Dorcadion elegans is a species of longhorn beetles of the subfamily Lamiinae.

Distribution
It is found in Russia, Kazakhstan, and Ukraine.

Description
The bands on the elytron have conspicuous points in the basal half.

Environment
It inhabits the steppes.

References

elegans
Beetles described in 1899
Beetles of Asia
Beetles of Europe